The 2018–19 season was Football Club Drita's 19th consecutive season in the top flight of Kosovar football. Drita will be involved in Football Superleague of Kosovo and Kosovar Cup.

Season overview

June
On 19 June, before leaving for Gibraltar Drita transferred footballer Betim Haxhimusa from their local rivals.

On 6 June Drita transferred Albanian goalkeeper Edvan Bakaj from KF Liria. Bakaj has signed a one-year contract with the club.

July
On 3 July after returning from the state of Gjilbardari and winning victories there in the Pre-Eliminary Round in the UEFA Champions League, FC Drita transferred the other player from his local rivals SC Gjilani, midfielder Zgjim Mustafa.

On 21 July was presented the offensive midfielder at Drita Eri Lamçja, was more active to KF Luftetari

August
On 3 August transferred Edenilson Bergonsi Bergonsi is not unheard of for the supporters as he was part of the Drita for the half-season at the end of 2016. "Edenilson Bergonsi is the next transfer for the 2018/2019 season. Bergonsi has signed a one-year contract with our team and Monday is expected to start drills with the group." said a club official!

On 6 August champions in power have formalized the deal with Filonit Shaqiri, who is the third player to come from rivals from the same city.

On 17 August Football Federation of Kosovo has sentenced FC Drita to 10,000 euros and 2 games without a spectators, with the reason that the supporters of FC Drita had wrong behavior by throwing fireworks on the field that significantly contaminated the air and hampered the course of the match and used offensive expression to the team and the opposing supporters

On 18 August although the transfer deadline for the transfer of players has been completed, FC Drita has presented the latest lead, defender Ervis Kaja. The player was recently part of KF Liria from Prizren, as he previously made his career in KF Tirana, KF Laçi, KF Besa.

September
On 13 September after Drita loss against KF Llapi, Bekim Isufi resigned from the position of the coach! Under the direction of Bekim Isufi, Drita was the champion of the Kosovo Super League, as well as won the Super Cup of Kosovo.

On 15 September Fisnik Kerçeli resigned from the position of the Sports director of the team. In the message to the Drita's supporters he said: "I can not remain indifferent to the situation that we are in. Recently, with the arrival of some unprofessional people, I think the situation got out of control!"

On 17 September Drita FC has signed a 1-year agreement with the coach from Albania, Shpëtim Duro. Duro in the past has coached Albanian clubs such as KF Partizani from Tirana, KF Flamurtari Vlorë from Vlora, KF Vllaznia from Shkodra, KF Skenderbeu from Korça and KF Shkëndija from Tetovo. This is the first time that Duro will lead a team in Kosovo.

On 17 September The club of Gjilan has formalized Ardian Nuhiu as assistant of Shpëtim Duro, who was presented on the same day to The Intellectuals. Nuhiu has signed the two-year contract.

December 
On 20 December, Drita was awarded as the best team of the year, Xhevdet Shabani was awarded as the best player of the year and the coach Bekim Isufi was awarded as the best coach of the year. Betim Haxhimusa and Kastriot Rexha have awarded for the best Superliga scorers with 13 goals each. Whereas for the best formation of the year are selected 3 players of Drita: Xhevdet Shabani, Kastriot Rexha and Endrit Krasniqi.

January 
On 2 January, Drita has held talks with Albania's National Team Player, Jahmir Hyka, by signing a contract for four months with a salary of 10,000 euros for month. But Hyka has rejected this offer due to the poor quality of Kosovo's Super League.

On 6 January, Drita announced the transfer of Arbër Shala loan to FC Kamza. He will stay at this club until the end of the season.

On 10 January, The defender, Perparim Osmani was loaned for six months from Prishtina to the Drita.

On 10 January, Drita has reached agreement with midfielder Endrit Krasniqi to continue co-operation for another year. Krasniqi's contract signed before international matches expired in January 2019.

On 16 January, Drita has announced that has unilaterally terminated the contract with the defender from Albania, Ervis Kaja. Kaja, as the club from Gjilan has announced, has not responded to the invitation to start the preparatory phase for the Superliga spring season.

On 21 January, Drita has announced the break-out of cooperation with the Edvan Bakaj the goalkeeper from Tirana.

On 22 January, Viktor Kuka ha loaned to KF Ferizaj for 6 month.

On 24 January, Has presented 5 players: Denis Haliti, left defender, who is called back from loan. Festim Krasniqi is another player who will strengthen the wing of the attack. Klajdi Burba a classic forward, and after Edvan Bakaj leave the team Drita has transferred Mario Kirev a goalkeeper from Kamza

February 
On 11 February, Ardian Nuhiu was named the new coach of FC Drita

Support
After celebrating the championship title, Drita FC supporters, Intelektualet, got ready for the UEFA Champions League, unfortunately, they could not be present in Gjilbartar because of the distance and ticket price! 

After the victories in Gibraltar, Drita played the first qualifying match in Mitrovica, as the Gjilan City Stadium did not meet the conditions of UEFA. So "Intellectuals" traveled 30 buses from Gjilan to Mitrovica, where about 10,000 supporters were present. Intellectuals unfold a giant choreographer with the message "A road paved with sacrifice 1990 - 2018",  this message was devoted to all Kosovar footballers who sacrificed everything for Kosovo football
- While in the return match, around 100 "intellectuals" in Malmö, Sweden,  where there unfolded a giant flag of Albania.

After losing from Malmö, Drita played against F91 Dudelange from Luxembourg. About 50 intellectuals were present in Luxembourg, while in the second game that took place in Mitrovica there were about 3,000 intellectuals.

In the SuperCup game between Drita and Prishtina, they traveled around 10 bus with intellectuals. In this game intellectuals threw pyrotechnics in the field, where 3 days after the match the Football Federation of Kosovo sentenced them with 2 games without supporters.

Squad information

Transfers

Summer

In:

Out:

Winter

In:

Out:

Pre-season and friendlies

Friendlies

Competitions

Overview

Football Superleague of Kosovo

Standings

Results summary

Goalscorers

Last updated: 23 September 2018

Disciplinary record

Last updated: 10 February 2019
Source: ffk-kosova.com

Matches

Kosovar Supercup
As the winners of the 2017–18 Kosovar Cup and 2017–18 Football Superleague of Kosovo, Drita faced the Kosovar Cup winner, Prishtina for the season opening Kosovar Supercup.

Kosovar Cup

Pre-season and friendlies

UEFA Champions League
Drita competed in the UEFA Champions League for the first time in the 2018–19 season, entering at the preliminary round. On 12 June 2018, in Nyon, the draw was held and Drita were drawn against the Andorran side Santa Coloma. On 26 June 2018, Drita beat Santa Coloma at Victoria Stadium in Gibraltar and became the first Kosovar side to win a UEFA Champions League match.

UEFA Europa League
After being eliminated from Malmö, Drita continued to play in the second qualifying round of UEFA Europa League. On 17 July 2018, Drita teaches the upcoming rival which was the champion of 2017–18 Luxembourg National Division, F91 Dudelange.

References

External links
 

Drita
Drita
Drita
FC Drita seasons
Drita